Ratonpur is a village of Shailkupa Upazila, Jhenaidah District, Bangladesh. It has a population of approximately 1,100.

References

Jhenaidah District
Populated places in Khulna Division